Xiomara Yolanda Griffith Mahon (born September 13, 1969) is a female judoka from Venezuela. She competed for her native South American country at three consecutive Summer Olympics, starting in 1992. Griffith won a total of three medals at the Pan American Games in the 1990s.

References
 

1969 births
Living people
Venezuelan female judoka
Judoka at the 1992 Summer Olympics
Judoka at the 1996 Summer Olympics
Judoka at the 2000 Summer Olympics
Judoka at the 1991 Pan American Games
Judoka at the 1995 Pan American Games
Judoka at the 1999 Pan American Games
Olympic judoka of Venezuela
Pan American Games silver medalists for Venezuela
Pan American Games bronze medalists for Venezuela
Pan American Games medalists in judo
Medalists at the 1991 Pan American Games
Medalists at the 1999 Pan American Games
20th-century Venezuelan women